Mike Owusu may refer to:

 Mike Owusu (footballer, born 1977), Ghanaian footballer
 Mike Owusu (footballer, born 1995), German-Ghanaian footballer